Delek Group is an Israeli conglomerate and one of Israel's largest companies, Delek Group is involved in the energy and infrastructure, with investments in upstream and downstream energy, water desalination and power plants. Delek Group' subsidiaries are also involved in insurance and financial services. Delek Group is listed on the Tel Aviv stock exchange under the ticker symbol, DLEKG, and is a member of the TA-35 Index of leading Israeli companies, as of July 2012 two of the group's subsidiaries are also listed on the TA-35 Index, Avner Oil Exploration LP and Delek Drilling LP. The Delek Group agreed to sell a 52% controlling stake of Phoenix Holding company (insurance and financial undertaking) to the Chinese civilian-run conglomerate Fosun International.

History
Delek, The Israel Fuel Corporation Ltd, was founded in 1951

In August 2007, Delek Benelux took over marketing activities for Chevron Global Energy Inc. in Benelux, including 869 fueling stations, mostly under the Texaco brand. The same month, Delek Israel's Delek Pi-Glilot, a fuel storage and distribution company operating in Ashdod, Jerusalem and Beersheba, won a Government Companies Authorities tender to run the fuel storage facilities in Ashdod. A few months later in November, they announced the hiring of former police commissioner Moshe Karadi to run Delek Pi-Glilot, who had recently resigned following findings by the Zeiler Commission "that police had grossly mishandled the murder investigation in the Perinian affair." Gabi Last, former commissioner and commander of the Tel Aviv Central District, has been chairing Delek Group for several years. On 1 January 2020, Idan Wallance became Delek's new CEO.

Holdings

Energy and Infrastructure

Upstream
 Delek Energy [87.6%]
Delek Drilling LP [68.8%]
 Avner Oil & Gas Exploration LP [55.9%]
Assets including holdings in: Yam Tethys Partnership, Tamar gas field, Leviathan gas field, Tanin gas field, Aphrodite gas field

Downstream
 
 Delek Petroleum Ltd. [100%] 
 Delek Europe BV [100%] - 1,230 gas stations and 935 convenience stores
 Roadchef [100%]
 Delek Israel Fuel Corporation Ltd [86.9%] Israel’s second largest retail gas and lubricants supplier

Infrastructure
 Independent Power Plants (IPP)
360 desalinisation plants constructed in Israel, Cyprus, China, Spain, United States, India and Kazakhstan
largest desalinisation plant in the world built in Israel

Insurance and Finance

 Phoenix Holdings Ltd.[56%] 
 The Phoenix Insurance Company Ltd.
 Excellence Investments Ltd. [85%]

Automotive
 Delek Automotive Systems Ltd. [32%] - largest car dealer in Israel, importer of Mazda and Ford vehicles

Chemicals
 Gadot Biochemical Ltd.

Former Holdings
 Delek Real Estate Ltd. - a company that owned a total land area of 1.8 million m2, through its subsidiaries, Delek Berlon International Ltd., Delek Global Real Estate Ltd., and adding Dankner Investments Ltd. as Dankner Real Estate's construction arm in 2004.
 HOT Cable Communications Systems Ltd.
 Starbucks Israel
 The Republic Group, an insurer, was sold to AmTrust Financial Services for $140 million on April 19, 2016.

Criticism

Involvement in Israeli settlements

On 12 February 2020, the United Nations published a database of 112 companies helping to further Israeli settlement activity in the West Bank, including East Jerusalem, as well as in the occupied Golan Heights. These settlements are considered illegal under international law. Delek was listed on the database on account of its "provision of services and utilities supporting the maintenance and existence of settlements" and "the use of natural resources, in particular water and land, for business
purposes" in these occupied territories.

On 5 July 2021, Norway's largest pension fund KLP said it would divest from Delek together with 15 other business entities implicated in the UN report for their links to Israeli settlements in the occupied West Bank.

See also
 Tamar gas field
 Leviathan gas field
 Aphrodite gas field

References

External links
Delek website

Companies listed on the Tel Aviv Stock Exchange
Conglomerate companies of Israel
Financial services companies of Israel
Israeli brands
1951 establishments in Israel
Netanya
Oil and gas companies of Israel
Filling stations in Israel
Real estate companies of Israel
Transport companies of Israel
Companies based in Netanya